Marcia Ochoa (born 9 September 1970) is a United States-based professor of Feminist Studies and Critical Race and Ethnic Studies at the University of California, Santa Cruz. They are the co-founder of El/La Para TransLatinas and is credited with popularizing the term "translatina."

Life 
Ochoa moved to San Francisco in 1994. They co-founded El/La Para TransLatinas in 2006 in San Francisco, California.

Career 
Ochoa completed her Ph.D. at Stanford University in Anthropology in 2005. She began teaching at the University of California, Santa Cruz in 2005, chaired the Feminist Studies department from 2014-17, and currently serves as Provost of Oakes College. She is also a professor of Critical Race and Ethnic Studies, Social Documentation, Anthropology, Latin American & Latino Studies, and Film and Digital Media.

She published her first book based on her dissertation, Queen for a Day: Transformistas, Beauty Queens and the Performance of Femininity in Venezuela, in 2014 through Duke University Press. It was nominated for a Lambda Literary Award. That same year, she edited the Transgender Studies Quarterly issue "Decolonizing the Transgender Imaginary". She is currently the editor of GLQ: A Journal of Lesbian and Gay Studies.

Following the publication of Queen for a Day, Ochoa's work focused on early colonial violence in Latin America.

References 

Feminist studies scholars
University of California, Santa Cruz faculty
Stanford University alumni
Academic journal editors
1970 births
Living people